Larkin Higgins is an American cross-disciplinary artist based in Los Angeles, California. Her work includes paintings, drawings, visual poetry, artists' books, book sculptures, installation art, collage, mail art, photo-related works, and performance art. Her published books of poetry combine text with logographic drawings. She is a tenured professor of art at California Lutheran University in Thousand Oaks, California.

Her work was celebrated at the Festival of Women in 1993, where she gave a talk on visual objects and the stories they tell.

She was included in a group exhibition focused on assemblage at the Kwan Fong Gallery of Art and Culture in 2009.

Work in permanent collections 

Her work is in the permanent collections of the following institutions:

 Grunwald Collection at the Hammer Museum (University of California, Los Angeles)
 Erie Art Museum
 Laguna Beach Museum of Art
 California Museum of Photography
 Charles E. Young Research Library, Special Collections
 Avant Writing Collection at The Ohio State University Libraries 
 Judith A. Hoffberg Archive  (University of California, Santa Barbara Library)
 University at Buffalo Libraries, Special Collections
 International Museum of Collage, Assemblage, and Construction

Bibliography 
Her published books of poetry include:

 Of Materials, Implements (Dusie Kollektiv)
 Matchbook: Poems (Red Wind Books), 1999 
 Of Traverse and Template (Mindmade Books), 2013 
 Soil culture, Frankenstein-grafted (Dusie), 2013 
 comb- ing mine- ings (Dusie), 2015

References

Year of birth missing (living people)
20th-century American artists
21st-century American artists
20th-century American poets
21st-century American poets
20th-century American women writers
21st-century American women writers
California Lutheran University faculty
Living people
Place of birth missing (living people)
American women academics